Leif Hoste (born 17 July 1977) is a retired Belgian professional road racing cyclist, who last rode for UCI Professional Continental Team team . Born in Kortrijk, Hoste's career highlights included winning two stages and the overall title at the 2006 Three Days of De Panne, the 2001, 2006 and 2007 Belgian national time trial championships, and a second-place finish at the 2004, 2006 and 2007 one-day classic Tour of Flanders.

At the 2006 Paris–Roubaix, after finishing second, Hoste was disqualified by the race jury for illegally riding through a closed level crossing along with Peter Van Petegem and Vladimir Gusev (who were also disqualified).

On 29 March 2013, the Belgian cycling federation began a doping case against Hoste. On 13 July 2014 it was confirmed by the UCI that Hoste had been banned for two years until 29 December 2015 for biological passport irregularities.

Major results

1998
 1st Stage 1 Tour de l'Avenir
 1st Stage 3 Circuito Montañés
1999
 5th Overall Tour Trans-Canada
 6th Grand Prix Eddy Merckx
 9th Duo Normand
2000
 1st Stage 3 Tour de Wallonie
 3rd National Time Trial Championships
 7th Grand Prix Eddy Merckx
2001
 1st  National Time Trial Championships
2002
 9th Sparkassen Giro Bochum
2003
 2nd National Time Trial Championships
 2nd Kuurne–Brussels–Kuurne
 3rd Grand Prix Eddy Merckx
2004
 2nd Tour of Flanders
 2nd Overall Tour de l'Ain
 3rd National Time Trial Championships
 6th Brussels–Ingooigem
 6th Druivenkoers Overijse
 8th Grand Prix Eddy Merckx
2005
 3rd Overall Eneco Tour of Benelux
2006
 1st  National Time Trial Championships
 1st Overall Three Days of De Panne
1st Mountains competition
1st Stages 1 & 4 (ITT)
 2nd Kuurne–Brussels–Kuurne
 2nd Tour of Flanders
 2nd Paris–Roubaix (DSQ)
 2nd Eindhoven Team Time Trial
 5th E3 Prijs Vlaanderen
2007
 1st  National Time Trial Championships
 2nd Tour of Flanders
 3rd Overall Tour of Belgium
 4th Overall Eneco Tour
 7th Overall Tour of Qatar
2008
 2nd National Time Trial Championships
 6th Paris–Roubaix
 7th Omloop Het Volk
2009
 4th Paris–Roubaix
 8th Overall Three Days of De Panne
2010
 3rd National Time Trial Championships
 8th Paris–Roubaix
2011
 7th Dwars door Vlaanderen

References

External links

Leif Hoste at dopeloogy.org

1977 births
Belgian sportspeople in doping cases
Doping cases in cycling
Living people
Belgian male cyclists
Sportspeople from Kortrijk
Cyclists from West Flanders